Benjamin Moloise (1955 – 18 October 1985) was a South African poet and political activist.

Life 
Moloise was born in 1955 in Alexandra. He was a factory worker, poet and follower of the then forbidden African National Congress (ANC). He was convicted to capital punishment by the apartheid regime of  P. W. Botha allegedly for murdering a policeman in 1982. The African National Congress claimed responsibility for the murder and repudiated the claim that Moloise was involved. He was hanged on 18 October 1985 at the Pretoria Central Prison despite worldwide pleas for clemency. His execution by the apartheid regime led to international protests and street battles in South Africa.

Before his execution he famously penned the following lines
"I am proud to be what I am…
The storm of oppression will be followed
By the rain of my blood
I am proud to give my life
My one solitary life."

Literature 
 Ritu Ashik: Benjamin Moloise, Biratnagar, Teshro Vishwa Weekly Publication, 1990

References

External links 
 Mandela, Moloise, Nicaragua and our days of innocence
 

Anti-apartheid activists
South African people convicted of murder
South African male poets
People from Alexandra, Gauteng
1955 births
1985 deaths
20th-century South African poets
Executed South African people
People executed by South Africa by hanging
20th-century executions by South Africa
Executed activists
20th-century South African male writers